The T3 is a Trunk Road in Zambia. The road runs from Kapiri Mposhi via Ndola, Kitwe and Chingola to Kasumbalesa on the border with DR Congo. The entire route is a toll road.

In Kapiri Mposhi, the T3 connects to the T2 Road to Lusaka, making it part of the main link between Zambia's Capital City and DR Congo.

The T3 is the main route through the Copperbelt Province, passing through 4 and bypassing 1 of the 10 main towns in the province. It is also the main linkage between Kapiri Mposhi and towns of the North-Western Province of Zambia, particularly Solwezi and Kasempa.

The T3 is entirely part of the Trans-African Highway network 9 or Beira-Lobito Highway, which connects Beira in Mozambique with Lobito in Angola. The T3 is also part of the Walvis Bay-Ndola-Lubumbashi Development Road. The T3 is part of the main connection between DR Congo and countries like Malawi, Namibia, Botswana, Mozambique, Zimbabwe and South Africa. As a result, the roads that make up the T3 are usually very busy in either direction (mostly with trucks).

Route

The T3 Road starts north of Kapiri Mposhi, Central Province, at a t-junction with the T2 Road (Tanzam Highway; Cairo-Cape Town Highway; Zambia's Great North Road), going northwards. After the first 10 kilometres, the road crosses into the Copperbelt Province.

From the T2 junction, the T3 Road travels for 110 km, through Masaiti District (one lane in each direction; passing through the Kafulafuta Toll Plaza just before the M6 Road junction), to the city of Ndola (Capital of the Copperbelt), famously known as The Friendly City. As Kabwe Road, it enters Ndola in a northwesterly direction, bypassing the industrial area of Bwana Mkubwa. At the roundabout after Jacaranda Mall, the T3 continues by way of following the road to the left. The road goes in a north-northwesterly direction as Nkana Road, crossing the Kafubu River and becoming an uphill road, where it separates the City Centre from the Kanini suburb. At the roundabout by the Ndola Teaching Hospital, the T3 continues westwards by way of a left turn onto Luanshya Road (2 lanes in each direction), where it separates the Hillcrest and Kansenshi suburbs.

By Levy Mwanawasa Stadium at a roundabout, the T3 meets the Ndola-Mufulira Road (designated as the M4 Road), which is the road that connects to the Congo Pedicle (The Area of DR Congo separating the Copperbelt Province and Luapula Province of Zambia). Many motorists coming from Southern Zambia prefer to use this route through Ndola, Mufulira and the Congo Pedicle road to reach Mansa, Luapula instead of the longer route going east of Kapiri Mposhi, due to this route requiring less time.

At the Levy Mwanawasa Stadium roundabout, the T3 becomes the Ndola-Kitwe Dual Carriageway, which is the freeway between Ndola and Kitwe (2 lanes in each direction). As a v-shaped carriageway, the dual carriageway begins by first going west-south-west for 17 kilometres, through the Michael Chilufya Sata Toll Plaza, to the Luanshya Turn-Off north of Fisenge, where there is a road southwards that provides access to the town of Luanshya (8 km away). Before the Michael Chilufya Sata Toll Plaza, the carriageway meets a road which provides access to the Dag Hammarskjöld Crash Site Memorial and the Ndola International Airport. At the Luanshya Turn, the dual carriageway turns to the north-west and goes for 37 km to the city centre of Kitwe, a commercial city. There are two universities on the Ndola-Kitwe Dual Carriageway, namely Northrise University in Ndola and Copperstone University near Luanshya.

The road enters Kitwe City Centre as President Avenue, beginning by crossing the Kafue River, passing the Luangwa and Wusakili suburbs and bypassing the Nkana Mine. After being the road separating the Nkana East and Nkana West suburbs, the T3 continues by way of a left turn onto Oxford Road and a right turn onto Independence Avenue in the city centre.

At the Kanyanta Road roundabout in the city centre, the T3 meets the eastern terminus of the M7 Road, which is the route that connects with Kalulushi, Lufwanyama and Kasempa in the west. It is the 1st route with access to the North-Western Province.

As Independence Avenue, it is the road connecting Kitwe Central with the northern suburbs of the city. From Kitwe Teaching Hospital, the T3 travels north-west for 50 km to the mining city of Chingola as the Kitwe-Chingola Dual Carriageway (2 lanes in each direction), passing through the mining town of Chambishi (part of Kalulushi District). At Sabina, 15 kilometres from Kitwe City Centre (10 kilometres before Chambishi), the T3 Road meets the northern terminus of the M16 Road (which is coming from Kalulushi) before meeting another road connecting to Mufulira and the Congo Pedicle road in the northeast, named Kitwe Road and designated as the M4 Road again. Just before the M16 junction (just after Kitwe's Garneton suburb) is the Wilson Mofya Chakulya Toll Plaza.

As the Kitwe city centre is a busy commercial area, heavy vehicles are advised to take an alternative route to Chingola rather than passing through Kitwe's city centre and northern suburbs. Trucks are advised to use the M7 Road from Kitwe to Kalulushi, then the M16 Road from Kalulushi to Sabina, as an alternative route. Sabina is where trucks rejoin the main road. While the T3 has the Wilson Mofya Chakulya Toll Plaza before Sabina, this alternative route for trucks also has a tollgate before Sabina (Kalulushi-Sabina Toll Plaza) on the M16 Road.

At the Independence Avenue roundabout south of Chingola Central, the T3 continues by way of a left turn. It goes northwest, separating the south-western part of Chingola from the central and eastern areas. North-west of Chingola Central, by the Chingola River, the T3 Road meets the eastern terminus of the T5 Road, which connects the Copperbelt with Solwezi and Mwinilunga in the North-Western Province & with a border into Angola just after Mwinilunga.

From the T5 junction in Chingola, the T3 goes north for 17 km, bypassing Nchanga Mines and crossing the Kafue River one more time, to the small town of Chililabombwe. It goes for a further 17 km, bypassing Konkola Copper Mines In Konkola, to end at the Kasumbalesa border with DR Congo. The Road becomes the N1 route of DR Congo and proceeds to Lubumbashi (100 kilometres away) in the north-west. The border town on the DR Congo side is also named Kasumbalesa.

Road Network
The T3 is entirely part of the Trans-African Highway network no. 9 or Beira-Lobito Highway, which connects Beira in Mozambique with Lobito in Angola. The T3 is also part of the Walvis Bay-Ndola-Lubumbashi Development Road between DR Congo and Namibia.

The T3 is part of the connection between DR Congo and countries in the south and south-east, like Malawi, Namibia, Botswana, Zimbabwe, Mozambique and South Africa. As a result, it is an important trade route and is commonly used by cars and trucks in either direction.

The border at Kasumbalesa is a very-busy border post, with a large number of trucks passing there per day.

M6 Road (Copperbelt)
The M6 Road is an alternative route, bypassing the City of Ndola and providing a shorter, more direct route to both Kitwe and Luanshya. The entire route is 33 km in length. It starts at a junction with the T3 road 34 kilometres south of Ndola by the Masangano Market of Masaiti District (near Kafulafuta), going north-west and rejoins the T3 just north of the small area of Fisenge in Luanshya District (8 km north of Luanshya), at the point where the T3 turns to the direction of Kitwe. Even the short 8 km road into Luanshya from Fisenge is designated as the M6.

This route is used by people who wish to skip the City of Ndola and who wish to avoid the Michael Chilufya Sata Toll Plaza west of Ndola at the point where the T3 enters Luanshya District.  So, people travelling from Kapiri Mposhi only have to pass through one toll gate, the Kafulafuta Toll Plaza just south of Masangano Market, before joining this road as a shortcut to Kitwe.

13 kilometers from Masangano Market, the M6 meets a road which goes north into the Mushili township of Ndola. 5 kilometers before Fisenge, the M6 meets a road which goes west into the Luanshya Town Centre.

The bypass, called the Fisenge Bypass on some maps, reduces the distance to Kitwe by 22 kilometres (saving motorists 10 minutes; estimated by Google Maps as of 2022). Despite the shortcut, most trucks and motor vehicles still pass through Ndola during their trips in either direction between Kapiri Mposhi (& Lusaka) in the south and Kitwe (& the Democratic Republic of the Congo) in the north-west.

Lusaka-Ndola Dual Carriageway 
On 8 September 2017, President Edgar Lungu commissioned the construction of the Lusaka-Ndola Dual Carriageway. This proposed route construction would transform the T2 Road (Great North Road) from Lusaka to Kapiri Mposhi, together with the T3 Road from Kapiri Mposhi to Ndola (a total distance of 320 kilometres), into a dual carriageway to ease the movement of vehicles such as trucks, buses and motor vehicles and reduce on accidents. As part of the same project, they also plan to do works on the 33-kilometre M6 Road from Masangano Market in Masaiti District to Fisenge in Luanshya District (as a shortcut to Kitwe; will be used by motorists wishing to avoid Ndola on the way to Kitwe).

This new dual carriageway would require bypasses around the towns of Kabwe and Kapiri Mposhi together with some grade-separated interchanges where necessary. Together with the already-existing Ndola-Kitwe Dual Carriageway and Kitwe-Chingola Dual Carriageway in the Copperbelt Province, this proposed road would provide a faster and safer journey from Lusaka to DR Congo. At the moment, the entire T3 from Ndola to Kapiri Mposhi, together with the T2 from Kapiri Mposhi to Lusaka, is a single carriageway with one lane in each direction.

The total cost of this 320 km road, after several increments, was finalized at $1.2 billion and construction began from Lusaka going northwards. Certain elements of society criticized the high cost of the road, as it would cost just over $3.7 million per kilometre. The deal was made with the China Jiangxi Corporation for International Economic and Technical Cooperation (CJIC) to construct the road.

However, only the section of the T2 (Great North Road) within the capital city (Lusaka District), up to the Six Miles Roundabout, has been completed as of June 2021, with the Ministry of Finance ordering for the Road Development Agency to halt the project, citing financial constraints.

In August 2021 (just after Zambia's Presidential Election), the newly-appointed Infrastructure, Housing and Urban Development Minister, Charles Milupi, stated that the road would cost less than the prescribed $1.2 billion under President Hakainde Hichilema's government. Road construction would only resume once the price has been renegotiated to a lower amount; otherwise, the project has not been cancelled.

So, the newly-formed government officially cancelled the deal that the previous government made with the China Jiangxi Corporation for International Economic and Technical Cooperation (CJIC), citing that the project was overpriced.

In early 2022, Hon Charles Milupi stated that completing this dual carriageway was of high importance. He stated that they would resume works on that road at a reduced cost after the rain season would pass in Zambia. Then, the Minister of Finance, Situmbeko Musokotwane, stated that this project (Lusaka-Ndola Dual Carriageway) would be financed by "Private Public Partnerships" (PPPs).

On 28 February 2023, the Minister of Finance, Situmbeko Musokotwane, together with other ministers, re-commissioned the construction of the Lusaka-Ndola Dual Carriageway at Protea Hotel in Ndola. The project is expected to cost $577 million and is being financed by a Private Public Partnership (concession). The consortium responsible for the construction and maintenance of the road is Macro-Ocean Investment Consortium. It is expected to take 3 years to completion and the concession agreement will be for another 22 years (up to 2048).

See also 
 Transport in Zambia
 Roads in Zambia

References

Roads in Zambia
Copperbelt Province